"If This Goes On—" is a science fiction novella by American writer Robert A. Heinlein, first serialized in 1940 in Astounding Science-Fiction and revised and expanded for inclusion in the 1953 collection Revolt in 2100. The novella shows what might happen to Christianity in the United States given mass communications, applied psychology, and a hysterical populace. The novel is part of Heinlein's Future History series.

At the 2016 WorldCon the story won the 1941 Retro-Hugo Award for Best Novella of 1940.

Plot 
The story is set in a future theocratic  American society, ruled by the latest in a series of fundamentalist Christian "Prophets". The First Prophet was Nehemiah Scudder, a backwoods preacher turned President (elected in 2012), then dictator (no elections were held in 2016 or later).

John Lyle, a junior army officer under the Prophet, is stationed at the Prophet's capital of New Jerusalem. He had been devout, but he finds himself questioning his faith when he falls for one of the Prophet's Virgins, Sister Judith. New to the vocation, Judith faints when she is called upon to submit sexually to the Prophet and is confined to her quarters until she sees the light. John confides in his far more worldly roommate, Zeb Jones, who is not shocked but even assists John. A clandestine meeting with Judith goes awry when they are forced to kill a spy. They are left with no choice but to seek aid from the Cabal, an underground revolutionary movement (Judith's friend, Sister Magdalene, is a member). The two men are inducted into the Cabal while they remain on duty in their army posts. Judith is arrested and tortured as part of the investigation into the death of the spy, and John and Zeb rescue her but leave enough clues that John is soon arrested and tortured himself. He gives little away and is himself rescued by the Cabal. Zeb and Magdalene have evaded arrest thanks to a clandestine distress signal that John manages to leave for Zeb while he is arrested.

Judith is spirited out of the country before John regains consciousness, and John is given a false identity to make his way to Cabal headquarters. He is detected en route, forced to flee, and arrives safely after several misadventures. He finds that Zeb and Magdalene, who he assumes are a couple, have made their way there before him. All take on significant roles in bringing to fruition the revolutionary plot, John as an aide to the commander, General Huxley.

Working there, John receives a literal "Dear John" letter from Judith, informing him of her impending marriage to a Mexican man she met while she was taking refuge in his country. He learns that Zeb and Magdalene have no marriage plans, as their strong personalities would inevitably clash, and he begins a romance with Magdalene.

The revolutionary plot is mostly successful, and the country other than New Jerusalem is seized. However, the capital must also be conquered lest it serve as a rallying point for loyalists. Even as constitutional discussions go on, the new regime's troops, tempered to provide the greatest possible individual freedom (this is the origin of the 'Covenant' mentioned in other Heinlein works), prepare to take New Jerusalem. John and Magdalene are married just before the assault.

During the fight, Huxley is wounded, and John must take over temporary command though he is not entitled by rank to do so. He gives the orders that bring victory. He then turns over command to the senior unwounded general and leads a squad invading the Prophet's private quarters. They find that he has been viciously killed by his own Virgins.

Freemasonry
The Cabal uses terminology associated with Freemasonry, and there are hints that the Masons are actually one of the groups involved in the loosely organized revolt against the government. (Heinlein himself was not a Mason, but had considered joining the Masons as a young man.)

Critical reception
Damon Knight wrote of the novel:

Revolution...has always been a favorite theme in science fiction.  It's romantic, it's reliable, and—as a rule—it's as phony as a Martian princess.

Who but Heinlein ever pointed out, as he does here in detail, that a modern revolution is big business?  And who but Heinlein would have seen that fraternal organizations, for thirty years the butt of highbrow American humor, would make the perfect nucleus for an American underground against tyranny?

Connections with other works by Heinlein
While set in Heinlein's Future History, the story is self-contained and has little connection with other works in the series. However, it is noted in Methuselah's Children that, during the time of this story, the secret of the Howard Families was held close (being a prize that was beyond the power of the Prophet to confiscate), and also that the Cabal assisted in helping the Howards maintain their Masquerade, the concealment of the existence of the Howards. Lazarus Long specifically mentions that he spent the period of the Interregnum, when the Prophets ruled the United States and space travel was forbidden, mostly on Venus.

The story also depicts the start of the negotiations which would lead to the Covenant, the somewhat idealized basis for government depicted in "Coventry", "Misfit", and Methuselah's Children.

Scudder was previously mentioned in passing in the short story "Logic of Empire" and later on in Heinlein's final novel To Sail Beyond the Sunset. A story about the rise of Scudder, "The Sound of His Wings", is contained in the Future History timeline, but was never written by Heinlein, who stated in the afterword to Revolt in 2100: "I will probably never write the story of Nehemiah Scudder, I dislike him too much". Also, a story called "The Stone Pillow", which would have depicted the earlier foredoomed opposition to the Theocracy, never got written, Heinlein noting that there was "too much tragedy in real life".

The 1940 version of "If This Goes On—" was believed to be Heinlein's first novel until the unpublished work For Us, the Living: A Comedy of Customs was discovered in 2003. The earlier, unpublished novel also features a Nehemiah Scudder who, though coming very close to gaining power, is stopped at the last moment by the mobilization of Libertarians.

Ward Carson wrote: "In For Us, the Living, space colonization waits until the end of the Twenty-First Century and Scudder is defeated; in the Future History it happens a century earlier and Scudder takes over the US. Heinlein made no explicit remark on this, but a causal connection could be made: in the Future History the bold individualistic Americans emigrated into space in the end of the Twentieth Century, and were not present in America to stop it from falling into the fanatic's hands."

References

External links 
 
 "If This Goes On—" parts one and two on the Internet Archive

1940 short stories
Dystopian novels
Libertarian science fiction books
Novels first published in serial form
Religion in science fiction
Short stories by Robert A. Heinlein
Social science fiction
Works originally published in Analog Science Fiction and Fact